Theinkha Bo was the father of kings Athinkhaya, Yazathingyan and Thihathu of Myinsaing, the dynasty that replaced the Pagan Dynasty in 1297. His descendants founded the kingdoms that succeeded Pagan: Myinsaing, Pinya, Sagaing and Ava.

According to the Burmese chronicles, Theinkha Bo was born in Binnaka to the sawbwa (saopha) (chief) of the town. Some time after his elder brother succeeded the chieftainship, he and his brother quarreled, forcing Theinkha Bo to leave town. He eventually settled at Myinsaing, a small town located in present-day Kyaukse District, and married a woman from a wealthy family there in 1260. The couple had four children. His three sons served in the Pagan army, and became commanders that King Narathihapate relied on. His youngest child married a son of the king.

Although the chronicles do not mention his ethnicity, British colonial era historians assumed that he was of Shan ethnicity based on the fact that his father was a sawbwa. The historian Michael Aung-Thwin has argued however that it is a mistake to equate the office with ethnicity, and that colonial scholarship grafted on Shan ethnicity to the so-called Shan brothers without any evidence.

Notes

References

Bibliography
 
 
 
 
 

Pagan dynasty
13th-century Burmese people